Amendment to allege use or AAU is a sworn statement signed by an entity wishing to register a trademark or service mark attesting to use of the mark in commerce. With the Amendment to Allege Use, the owner must submit one product specimen that makes commercial use of the mark for each class of goods or services included in the application.

See also
Allegation of use

Trademark law